Y1 has several uses including:
 Boeing Y1, the anticipated replacement for the company's existing Boeing 737 airliner
 Great Northern Y-1, an electric locomotive used by the Great Northern Railway.
 Y1 adrenocortical cell, a mouse cell line
 Y1 (railcar), a Swedish-made diesel multiple unit train
 LNER Class Y1, a class of British steam locomotives 
 Y1 (tobacco), a genetically altered tobacco
and also :
 Blue Air IATA airline code
 y1, Yellow seed 1, a sorghum gene implied in the phlobaphene pigments pathway